Kheyrabad (also Romanized as Kheyrābād) is a village in Eresk Rural District, Eresk District, Boshruyeh County, South Khorasan Province, Iran. At the 2006 census, its population was 16, in 5 families.

References 

Populated places in Boshruyeh County